John Hall (12 November 1906 – 1978) was a British sports shooter. He competed in the 50 metre rifle, prone event at the 1964 Summer Olympics.

References

1906 births
1978 deaths
British male sport shooters
Olympic shooters of Great Britain
Shooters at the 1964 Summer Olympics
Place of birth missing
20th-century British people